This is the list of cathedrals in Sri Lanka sorted by denomination.

Roman Catholic
Cathedrals of the Roman Catholic Church in Sri Lanka:

 St. Joseph’s Cathedral, Anuradhapura
 St. Mary's Cathedral, Badulla
 St. Mary's Cathedral, Batticaloa
 St. Mary's Cathedral, Chilaw
 St. Lucia's Cathedral, Colombo
 St. Mary's Cathedral, Galle
 St. Mary's Cathedral, Jaffna
 St. Anthony's Cathedral, Kandy
 St. Anne's Cathedral, Kurunegala
 St. Sebastian's Cathedral, Mannar
 Cathedral of Sts. Peter and Paul, Ratnapura
 St. Mary's Cathedral, Trincomalee

Anglican
Anglican cathedrals in Sri Lanka:
 Church of Ceylon
 Cathedral of Christ the Living Saviour, Colombo
 Cathedral of Christ the King, Kurunegala
 Church of South India
 St. Thomas' Cathedral, Vaddukoddai

See also

List of cathedrals
Christianity in Sri Lanka

References

 
Sri Lanka
Cathedrals
Cathedrals